KSHE (styled as K-SHE) is a Classic rock radio station licensed to Crestwood, Missouri which serves the Greater St. Louis area. KSHE transmits on 94.7 MHz and currently uses the slogan "KSHE 95, Real Rock Radio". Owned by Hubbard Broadcasting, the station's studios are located in Creve Coeur, while the transmitter is located in Shrewsbury.

History
After working as an engineer for 20 years with the Pulitzer stations KSD and KSD-TV, Ed Ceries invested his life savings and his considerable engineering efforts in building his own FM station, which he called KSHE. He built some of the equipment himself, and on February 11, 1961, the station signed on from the basement of the Ceries' home in suburban Crestwood. The station called itself "The Lady of FM," and had a classical music format. For a while, all the announcers were women. Most of the basement was used for the station operations, with the Associated Press Teletype installed next to the clothes washer. The record library room doubled as an administrative office where Mrs. Ceries also did her ironing. Listener loyalty was strong, and at times they would come to the station with copies of classical selections they thought were better than the ones being played on KSHE. Unfortunately, advertisers were not convinced FM radio—particularly classical music on FM radio—had much of an audience. After the first year, the format was adjusted to contain about 90% middle-of-the-road music and 10% classical, with nine daily news broadcasts. In 1964, the station was sold to Century Broadcasting.

New general manager Howard Grafman was convinced by his friend Ron Elz to adopt a new format that Elz had heard on a trip to San Francisco on KMPX: album-oriented rock, with high latitude given to individual DJs as to what to play. The very first rock song played on KSHE in November 1967 that ushered in their format change, was Jefferson Airplane's "White Rabbit". KSHE sometimes played music nonstop for hours without station identification, which eventually was brought to the attention of the FCC and warnings from the agency to identify as required. In late 1967, '68 and most of '69 they would play whole albums in the late afternoon and late at night any day of the week. Albums played in their entirety included such titles as The Firesign Theatre's Waiting for the Electrician or Someone Like Him, The Who's Tommy, Bonzo Dog Doo-Dah Band's Gorilla, Arlo Guthrie's Alice's Restaurant, and Iron Butterfly's In-A-Gadda-Da-Vida, just to name a few.

During the 1970s and early 1980s, KSHE was influential in the growth of many midwestern bands such as Styx, Cheap Trick, REO Speedwagon and Head East. KSHE had a wide and varied play list, which popularized such rock artists as Lake from Germany, Stingray from South Africa, and rising bands from Australia and New Zealand like Midnight Oil and Split Enz, as well as playing the classics from the more well-known rock legends.

KSHE would frequently play concept albums in their entirety, as well as entire album sides from favorites such as Rush. Sunday evenings were dedicated to playing seven albums from seven different artists on a show called the Seventh Day starting in the late 1970s, a program that continues to this day. The albums usually were played from 7:00 pm until after midnight.  The Seventh Day concept was later used by other stations around the country.

Instead of the broadcast convention of reading news ripped from the Associated Press or United Press International wire machine ("rip and read"), early KSHE newscasts introduced news topics by preceding the story with rock music excerpts that had lyrics introducing or commenting on the topic.

From 1996 to 2012, KSHE aired The Bob & Tom Show in morning drive, syndicated from WFBQ in Indianapolis.

KSHE created a virtual museum on its website as a way of celebrating its 40th birthday.  It contains video clips, audio clips, pictures and memorabilia.  The first inductees (2007) were Rush, Kiss, Ted Nugent, and REO Speedwagon.

In March 2010, KSHE held its annual March Bandness—the third-longest version of this contest in the US. Along with the typical classic rock, KSHE's format also includes standard modern rock.  KSHE also has various subgenres for various times of day, such as Hair Band Doran (DJ: Mike Doran) from 8pm-9pm weekdays (previously called '80s at 8 under the previous DJ, Katy Kruze) and Monday Night Metal with Tom "Real Rock" Terbrock on Tuesday nights from 9 pm to midnight (originally on Monday night at 10 pm with Radio/Radical Rich from the mid-'80s until 1987 when it was moved to Tuesday night, until it was canceled in the mid-'90s; returning with Terbrock in the summer of 2006). KSHE DJ Lern has restarted Monday Night Metal, every Monday 9 p.m. to Midnight. At 5 pm each weekday, KSHE plays "The Daily Dose", two Led Zeppelin songs presented with trivia about their creation or notable performances of the songs.

Mascot
The station mascot is a sunglasses-and-headphones-wearing pig named "Sweetmeat," the likeness of which originally appeared on the cover of Blodwyn Pig's 1969 album 'Ahead Rings Out'.

Like the pig pictured on the LP cover, Sweetmeat first appeared with a joint in his mouth. This "controversial" detail disappeared in the early '80s in favor of an updated, cartoon "rocker" pig. In recent years, the station has returned to using the original image, along with the original KSHE-95 text logo. 

Sweetmeat also inspired the name of Austin, Texas Christian Punk/Thrash band One Bad Pig.

References

External links
Official website
KSHE 95 Station History & KSHE Classics
http://kshedjs.tripod.com/kshedjs.html
http://www.stlmediahistory.com/index.php/Radio/RadioHOFDetail/elz-ron
http://www.stlmediahistory.com/index.php/Radio/RadioArticles/st.-louis-vintage-rock-station-was-a-lady-first
http://www.stlmediahistory.com/index.php/Radio/RadioArticles/kshe-imports-a-format-from-the-west
KSHE Collection at the St. Louis Public Library

Hubbard Broadcasting
Classic rock radio stations in the United States
Radio stations established in 1961
SHE